Raymond Scott Robertson (born 11 December 1959 in Hamilton, Scotland) is a Scottish Conservative politician.

Early life
He was educated at Glasgow University, graduating Master of Arts with Honours in Modern History and Politics. During the 1980s he taught Modern Studies at Dumbarton Academy and Smithycroft Secondary School in Glasgow's East End.

Parliamentary career
After unsuccessfully contesting Clydesdale in 1987, he was selected as Scottish Conservative and Unionist Party candidate for Aberdeen South. In a surprise result, at the 1992 United Kingdom general election, he was elected as Member of Parliament (MP) for Aberdeen South, defeating Labour's Frank Doran, who had held the seat since 1987. In 1995 he was appointed Minister for Education, Housing, Fisheries and Sport at the Scottish Office, a post he held until the 1997 United Kingdom general election.

Outside Parliament
After losing the Aberdeen South seat to Labour's Anne Begg at the 1997 general election, he became Scottish Conservative and Unionist Party Chairman. In 2001, he resigned after unsuccessfully contesting the Eastwood constituency at the 2001 general election and the subsequent resignation of William Hague, the then Conservative Party leader.

After politics he became a founding director of Halogen Communications Ltd, a public affairs and public relations consultancy with offices in Edinburgh and Washington, D.C.

External links 
 
 Halogen Communications Ltd

1959 births
Living people
Members of the Parliament of the United Kingdom for Aberdeen constituencies
Alumni of the University of Glasgow
Scottish Conservative Party MPs
UK MPs 1992–1997
Politicians from Hamilton, South Lanarkshire